Polovragi was a Dacian fortified town.

References 
 Dr. Gheorghe Calotoiu, Ion Mocioi, Vasile Marinoiu. Mărturii arheologice în Gorj

External links 
 Dr. Gheorghe Calotoiu. Pe malul Olteţului, cetatea dacică de la Polovragi

Notes 

Dacian fortresses in Gorj County
Historic monuments in Gorj County